The Legacy series of essay collections was produced by Oxford University Press, from the early 1920s. It was aimed at Workers' Educational Association and university extension courses, and was an initiative of John Johnson.

The more recent Appraisal volumes move away from general surveys, to include articles with a focus on the history of relevant literary topics.

Notes

Series of books
Oxford University Press